Go Home may refer to:

Entertainment
 Go Home (film), 2015 film
 Go Home (album), 1970 album by the Art Ensemble of Chicago
 "Go Home" (song), 1985 song by Stevie Wonder
 Go Home Productions, Mark Vidler, English producer/remixer/DJ

Places
 Go Home Lake, lake in west central Ontario, Canada
 Go Home River, river in west central Ontario that flows west from Go Home Lake
 Go Home, Ontario, community in the Township of Georgian Bay, Ontario

See also 
 
 Going Home (disambiguation)